Xyloryctidae is a family of moths contained within the superfamily Gelechioidea described by Edward Meyrick in 1890. Most genera are found in the Indo-Australian region. While many of these moths are tiny, some members of the family grow to a wingspan of up to 66 mm, making them giants among the micromoths.

The first recorded instance of a common name for these moths comes from Swainson's On the History and Natural Arrangement of Insects, 1840, where members of the genus Cryptophasa are described as hermit moths. This is an allusion to the caterpillar's habit of living alone in a purely residential burrow in a tree branch, to which it drags leaves at night, attaching them with silk to the entrance to the burrow and consuming the leaves as they dry out.

The name 'timber moths' was coined by the Queensland naturalist Rowland Illidge in 1892, later published in 1895, and serves to distinguish these moths from other wood-boring Australian moths such as ghost moths (Hepialidae) and giant wood moths (Cossidae), which feed on sap or wood. It refers to the fact that the larvae of most members of this family are arboreal, whether they burrow into branches, bore into flower heads, tunnel under bark, or feed on lichens. Moths of the genus Maroga are pests of wattles (Acacia) and have crossed over from their wild host plant to become serious pests of cultivated stone fruit trees, particularly cherries.

Formerly, Xyloryctidae were placed in the Oecophoridae as the subfamily Xyloryctinae. Recent research suggests the Xyloryctidae are an independent family, sharing common ancestry with the Oecophoridae, but not descended from them.

Taxonomy and systematics
The family includes the following genera:

 Acompsogma Meyrick, 1938
 Amorbaea Meyrick, 1908
 Anachastis Meyrick, 1911
 Anoditica Meyrick, 1938
 Anoecea Diakonoff, 1951
 Antisclerota Meyrick, 1938
 Araeostoma Turner, 1917
 Arignota Turner, 1898
 Arsirrhyncha Meyrick, 1938
 Athrypsiastis Meyrick, 1910
 Bassarodes Meyrick, 1910
 Bathydoxa Turner, 1935
 Bida Walker, 1864
 Boydia Newman, 1856
 Brachybelistis Turner, 1902
 Caenorycta Meyrick, 1922
 Callicopris Meyrick, 1938
 Capnolocha Meyrick, 1925
 Catanomistis Meyrick, 1933
 Catoryctis Meyrick, 1890
 Chalarotona Meyrick, 1890
 Chereuta Meyrick, 1906
 Chironeura Diakonoff, 1954
 Cilicitis Meyrick, 1938
 Cladophantis Meyrick, 1918
 Clepsigenes Meyrick, 1930
 Clerarcha Meyrick, 1890
 Comocritis Meyrick, 1894
 Compsotorna Meyrick, 1890
 Copidoris Meyrick, 1907
 Crypsicharis Meyrick, 1890
 Cryptophasa Lewin, 1805
 Cyanocrates Meyrick, 1925
 Cyphoryctis Meyrick, 1934
 Donacostola Meyrick, 1931
 Echiomima Meyrick, 1915
 Epichostis Meyrick, 1906
 Epidiopteryx Rebel in Rebel & Zerny, 1916
 Eporycta Meyrick, 1908
 Eschatura Meyrick, 1897
 Eumenodora Meyrick, 1906
 Eupetochira Meyrick, 1917
 Exacristis Meyrick, 1921
 Exoditis Meyrick, 1933
 Gemorodes Meyrick, 1925
 Ghuryx Viette, 1956
 Glycynympha Meyrick, 1925
 Gomphoscopa Lower, 1901
 Gonioma Turner, 1898
 Hermogenes Zeller, 1867
 Heterochyta Meyrick, 1906
 Hylypnes Turner, 1897
 Hyperoptica Meyrick in Caradja & Meyrick, 1934
 Idiomictis Meyrick, 1935
 Illidgea Turner, 1898
 Iulactis Meyrick, 1918
 Leistarcha Meyrick, 1883
 Leptobelistis Turner, 1902
 Lichenaula Meyrick, 1890
 Linoclostis Meyrick, 1908
 Liparistis Meyrick, 1915
 Lophobela Turner, 1917
 Malacognostis Meyrick, 1926
 Maroga Walker, 1864
 Metantithyra Viette, 1957
 Metathrinca Meyrick, 1908
 Microphidias Meyrick, 1937
 Mnarolitia Viette, 1954
 Mystacernis Meyrick, 1915
 Neospastis Meyrick, 1917
 Niphorycta Meyrick, 1938
 Opisina Walker, 1864
 Pansepta Meyrick, 1915
 Pantelamprus Christoph, 1882
 Paraclada Meyrick, 1911
 Paralecta Turner, 1898
 Perixestis Meyrick, 1917
 Philarista Meyrick, 1917
 Phracyps Viette, 1952
 Phthonerodes Meyrick, 1890
 Pilostibes Meyrick, 1890
 Plectophila Meyrick, 1890
 Potniarcha Meyrick, 1917
 Prothamnodes Meyrick, 1923
 Psarolitia Viette, 1956
 Pseudoprocometis Viette, 1952
 Sphalerostola Meyrick, 1927
 Stachyneura Diakonoff, 1948
 Symphorostola Meyrick, 1927
 Synchalara Meyrick, 1917
 Telecrates Meyrick, 1890
 Thymiatris Meyrick, 1907
 Thysiarcha Meyrick, 1925
 Thyrocopa Meyrick, 1883
 Trypherantis Meyrick, 1907
 Tymbophora Meyrick, 1890
 Uzucha Walker, 1864
 Xerocrates Meyrick, 1917
 Xylodryadella T. B. Fletcher, 1940
 Xylomimetes Turner, 1916
 Xylorycta Meyrick, 1890
 Zaphanaula Meyrick, 1920
 Zauclophora Turner, 1900

References

 Holloway, 2001, The families of Malesian moths and butterflies, Fauna Malesiana handbooks, (205).
 Kaila, 2004, Phylogeny of the superfamily Gelechioidea (Lepidoptera: Ditrysia): an exemplar approach, Cladistics 20 303–340.
 Hoare, 2005, Hierodoris (Insecta: Lepidoptera: Gelechioidea: Oecophoridae), and overview of Oecophoridae, Fauna of New Zealand, Ko te Aitanga Pepeke o Aotearoa, 54 pp. 13–25.
 Richard brown, Sibyl Bucheli, and SangMi Lee, 2006, Gelechioidea, A Global Framework
 Zborowski and Edwards, 2007, A Guide to Australian moths, CSIRO, 1–214.

External links

 Mississippi Entomological Museum: List of Xyloryctidae Genera

 
Gelechioidea
Moth families